Darryl Edestrand (November 6, 1945 – October 8, 2017) was a Canadian professional ice hockey defenceman who played 455 games in the National Hockey League (NHL) for the St. Louis Blues, Philadelphia Flyers, Pittsburgh Penguins, Boston Bruins, and Los Angeles Kings. He featured in two Stanley Cup Finals with the Bruins.

He died on October 8, 2017.

Career statistics

References

External links
 

1945 births
2017 deaths
Boston Bruins players
Canadian ice hockey defencemen
Ice hockey people from Ontario
Los Angeles Kings players
People from Strathroy-Caradoc
Philadelphia Flyers players
Pittsburgh Penguins players
St. Louis Blues players